Novomusino (Yañı Musa) is a rural locality (a selo) in Ilkineyevsky Selsoviet, Kuyurgazinsky District, Bashkortostan, Russia. The population was 305 as of 2010. There are 7 streets.

Geography 
Novomusino is located 28 km northwest of Yermolayevo (the district's administrative centre) by road. Malomusino is the nearest rural locality.

References 

Rural localities in Kuyurgazinsky District